Fuquay Mineral Spring is a historic mineral spring located at Fuquay-Varina, Wake County, North Carolina.  The spring was discovered in the 1850s, and, from 1900 to 1930, thousands of people visited the spring to drink the mineral water reputed to cure kidney and intestinal ailments.  The spring is covered by a gazebo and reached by a small footbridge.

It was listed on the National Register of Historic Places in 1986.

References

Buildings and structures on the National Register of Historic Places in North Carolina
Buildings and structures completed in 1900
Buildings and structures in Wake County, North Carolina
National Register of Historic Places in Wake County, North Carolina